Aunt Louisa's Nursery Favourite is a book by Laura Valentine released in 1870 and containing stories like "Diamonds and Toads", "Lily Sweetbriar", "Dick Whittington" and "Uncle's Farm Yard".

References

External links 

1870 books
Children's short story collections
British short story collections
British children's books